The maritime transportation of spent nuclear fuel and other high-level radioactive wastes requires the use of purpose-built vessels which meet the International Maritime Organization's INF classification standards. These standards were introduced in 1993 and made mandatory in 2001. As of 2020, the list below is limited to active vessels and may not be exhaustive.

References 

Nuclear fuel carrier
Nuclear industry